Francine Dauven (born 7 January 1949) is a Belgian former backstroke swimmer. She competed in two events at the 1968 Summer Olympics.

References

External links
 

1949 births
Living people
Belgian female backstroke swimmers
Olympic swimmers of Belgium
Swimmers at the 1968 Summer Olympics
Sportspeople from Liège